Sergo (Sergei) Parmenovich Kotrikadze (9 August 1936 – 3 May 2011) was a Georgian association footballer from the former Soviet Union who played for FC Dinamo Tbilisi and FC Torpedo Kutaisi. He was part of the USSR's squad for the 1962 FIFA World Cup, but did not win any caps, although he played in two Olympic qualifiers.

References

1936 births
2011 deaths
People from Guria
Footballers from Georgia (country)
Soviet footballers
FC Dinamo Tbilisi players
1962 FIFA World Cup players
FC Torpedo Kutaisi players
Football managers from Georgia (country)
Association football goalkeepers